Rammstein Festival Tour 2017 is the unofficial name for Rammstein's 2017 Tour.

History 
In late November 2016 Rammstein announced that they would be doing more festival shows in the summer of 2017.

After tickets to shows in Prague and Nîmes sold out in a few days, Rammstein announced that they would be doing further shows in Nîmes and Prague (one extra date for Prague, and two for Nîmes).

The tour was also the first show in Iceland since 2001.

Opening for them in Chicago was 3Teeth, in Dallas it was Hellyeah, while in Vegas they were joined by Korn and Stone Sour.

Set list 

 "Ramm4"
 "Reise, Reise"
 "Halleluja"
 "Zerstören"
 "Keine Lust"
 "Feuer frei!"
 "Seemann"
 "Ich tu dir weh"
 "Du riechst so gut"
 "Mein Herz brennt"
 "Links 2-3-4"
 "Ich will"
 "Du hast"
 "Stripped"
Encore
 "Sonne"
 "Amerika"
 "Engel"

Note: "Frühling in Paris" was played during the shows in Nîmes and "Te quiero puta!" was performed in Spain.

Tour dates 

Cancelled dates

References 

2017 concert tours
Rammstein concert tours